Kaya Kong Abutin ang Langit (International title: Selfish Desires / ) is a Philippine television drama series broadcast by GMA Network. Based on a 1984 Philippine film of the same title, the series is the sixteenth instalment of Sine Novela. Directed by Topel Lee, it stars Iza Calzado and Wendell Ramos. It premiered on September 28, 2009 on the network's Dramarama sa Hapon line up replacing Ngayon at Kailanman. The series concluded on February 5, 2010 with a total of 95 episodes. It was replaced by Gumapang Ka sa Lusak in its timeslot.

Cast and characters

Lead cast
 Iza Calzado as Clarissa Rosales / Clarisse Gardamonte
 Wendell Ramos as Daryl Revilla

Supporting cast
 Angelika dela Cruz as Nancy Rosales
 Chanda Romero as Lucia Enriquez-Recto 
 Bobby Andrews as Nick Arnaldo
 Isabel Oli as Therese Gardamonte
 Ricardo Cepeda as Ralph Gardamonte
 Pinky Amador as Monina Arnaldo-Gardamonte
 Lani Mercado as Naty Rosales
 Ehra Madrigal as Victoria Manalo
 Paolo Paraiso as James Rodriguez
 Victor Aliwalas as Jerome Recto
 Steven Silva as Patrick
 Ryan Yllana as Oz
 Peter Serrano as Maurice

Guest cast
 Bianca Umali as young Nancy Rosales
 Jacob Rica as young Daryl Revilla

Ratings
According to AGB Nielsen Philippines' Mega Manila household television ratings, the pilot episode of Kaya Kong Abutin ang Langit earned a 7.5% rating. While the final episode scored a 20% rating.

References

External links
 

2009 Philippine television series debuts
2010 Philippine television series endings
Filipino-language television shows
GMA Network drama series
Live action television shows based on films
Television shows set in the Philippines